The 2015 Uttar Pradesh train accident occurred on 20 March 2015. The Dehradun Varanasi Janata Express (train number 14266) derailed near Bachhrawan in Raebareli, Uttar Pradesh, northern India, resulting in at least fifty-eight deaths and 150 people being injured. The accident was attributed to brake failure.

Accident
The locomotive and two carriages were derailed. The train was reported to be carrying more than 400 passengers and 85 members of staff. The driver reported by radio that his brakes had failed, and that he could not stop the train. It was diverted into a siding and crashed through the buffers at Bachhrawan. Photographs show that the carriage next to the locomotive was severely telescoped, it was reported to have been packed with passengers. Fifty-eight people were killed, and more than 150 were injured. A preliminary report published by the Ministry of Civil Aviation reports 39 dead and 38 injured passengers. A team of doctors from the King George's Medical University in Lucknow was dispatched to the scene of the accident. The injured were taken to the King George's Medical University and Sanjay Gandhi Post Graduate Institute of Medical Sciences in Lucknow, or to a hospital in Rae Bareli.

Investigation
An investigation was opened into the accident by the Commission of Railway Safety. Brake failure was stated by unidentified railway sources as the cause of the accident. The train's driver and guard were seen by witnesses signalling that there was a problem with the train.

Provisional findings of the Commission of Railway Safety discussed on a conference in October 2015 report a “discontinuity of brake pipe pressure between the train engine and the trailing load of passenger coaches caused by wrong position of additional cut out cock provided in the brake pipe of the locomotive which is not having the safety features specified in the design against inadvertent or unauthorized operation.”

See also
List of Indian rail incidents
List of rail accidents (2010–present)

References

2015 disasters in India
Railway accidents in 2015
Railway accidents and incidents in Uttar Pradesh
History of Uttar Pradesh (1947–present)
Derailments in India
March 2015 events in India
Raebareli district